Crevenna is the surname of the following persons:

 Alfredo B. Crevenna, Mexican film director
 Richard Crevenna, Austrian medicine and university professor